Zeffiro was one of eight  built for the  (Royal Italian Navy) during the 1920s. She was named after a westerly wind, Zeffiro, common in summer in the Mediterranean. The ship played a minor role in the Spanish Civil War of 1936–1937, supporting the Nationalists.

Design and description
The Turbine-class destroyers were enlarged and improved versions of the preceding  s. Their complement was 12 officers and 167 enlisted men.

The Turbines were powered by two Parsons geared steam turbines, each driving one propeller shaft using steam supplied by three Thornycroft boilers.

Their main battery consisted of four  guns in two twin-gun turrets, one each fore and aft of the superstructure. Anti-aircraft (AA) defense for the Turbine-class ships was provided by a pair of  AA guns in single mounts amidships and a twin-gun mount for  machine guns. They were equipped with six  torpedo tubes in two triple mounts amidships. The Turbines could carry 52 mines.

Construction and career

Zeffiro was laid down by Gio. Ansaldo & C. at their Genoa-Sestri Ponente shipyard on 29 April 1925, launched on 27 May 1927 and completed on 15 May 1928. Between 1929 and 1932 she carried out several training cruises in the Mediterranean.

Spanish Civil War
After the Civil War started in Spain in July 1936, both Italy and Nazi Germany supported the Nationalists of General Franco, whereas Soviet Union was actively supporting the Republicans. During the first year of the war, the Soviets used the Republican controlled ports of Bilbao and Santander in the North of Spain adjacent to the French border, but after their fall in the summer of 1937, the USSR was forced to use ports in the Mediterranean to continue supplying the Republicans. Both Italy and Germany deployed their submarines in the Mediterranean in early 1937 to interdict with Republican shipping, but without much success. On 3 August 1937 Franco made an urgent plea with Mussolini to use the Italian fleet to prevent the passage of a large Soviet transport convoy, which just departed from Odessa. Originally, only submarines were supposed to be used, but Mussolini was convinced by Franco to use Italian surface ships too against the Soviets. Zeffiro participated in several patrols, which normally lasted three days, often paired with her sister , but none of her missions were successful.

In September 1937 the Nyon Conference was called by France and Great Britain to address the "underwater piracy" conducted against merchant traffic in the Mediterranean. On 14 September an agreement was signed establishing British and French patrol zones around Spain (with a total of 60 destroyers and airforce employed) to counteract aggressive behavior by submarines. Italy was not directly accused, but had to comply with the agreement and suspend the maritime operations.

World War II
At the time of the Italian entrance into World War II on 10 June 1940, Zeffiro together with sister ships ,  and  formed 2nd Destroyer Squadron based at Taranto.

The three vessels were to transport to Tobruk two anti-aircraft batteries (10 Breda Model 35 cannons in all),  of ammunition (450,000 rounds) and 162 members of the Voluntary Militia for Territorial Security.

The Italian destroyers were theoretically faster than the British cruisers, but due to their age and heavy cargo on board their speed advantage was nullified. In addition, 's third boiler turned out to be defective, limiting the destroyer's speed to just . In fact, Italians drew first blood, when a single Italian  shell hit  just 3 ft above the waterline, with splinters penetrating the warheads of two torpedoes, but caused little damage otherwise. Despite heavy firing,  was not hit until 20:00, when her engine rooms were struck bringing the vessel to a stop. The 7th Squadron expended about 5,000 shells, more than 1,600 of main caliber, before the Italian destroyer was sunk, after 130 minutes of fierce fighting.  rescued 47 out of 225 men from the Italian destroyer, and thirty six more escaped on rafts, but only six of them were later found alive by Italian submarine  almost 20 days later. Captain Baroni died aboard his ship, and was posthumously awarded the Medaglia d´oro al valor militare.

On the morning of 29 June 1940  and Zeffiro arrived in Benghazi before proceeding to Tobruk where they arrived on July 1.

Another Italian convoy sailed to Tobruk on 30 June 1940 from Augusta carrying troops, supplies, ammunition and fuel. The convoy consisted of six cargo and passenger ships and was escorted by 6 destroyers and 4 torpedo boats. The Royal Navy failed to intercept this convoy, in large part due to the large ammunition expenditure in their previous confrontation. On 5 July 1940 there were seven s berthed in Tobruk harbor together with four torpedo boats, six freighters and several auxiliary vessels. Between 10:00 to 11:15 a Short Sunderland reconnaissance plane overflew the harbor at an altitude of 1,500-2,000 meters and despite the anti-aircraft fire opened against it, confirmed the presence of numerous ships in the harbor. In the late afternoon a group of nine Fairey Swordfish torpedo bombers of 813 Naval Air Squadron took off from the airfield in Sidi Barrani and headed towards Tobruk. The air alarm was sounded at 20:06 but the Italians failed to detect the Allied aircraft until they were already over the harbor at 20:20. Destroyers had most of their personnel on board steamers Liguria and Sabbia with exception of dedicated air defense crews. The attack commenced a few minutes later, and lasted only seven minutes and resulted in five Italian ships being sunk or damaged. Not encountering any aerial opposition, British torpedo bombers attacked from low altitude (around 100 feet), and released their torpedoes from 400–500 meters away, almost point-blank. Zeffiro was attacked first by a plane piloted by Nicholas Kennedy, whose torpedo hit Zeffiro in the bow, around the ammunition depot, between the bridge and a 120 mm cannon. The explosion broke the ship into two and sank it half an hour later. Freighter  was also hit, capsized and sank, while  and steamer  were hit, and had to be beached, and the ocean liner  was hit and damaged. Two planes also attacked other destroyers, but failed to launch their torpedoes due to intense anti-aircraft fire. The air alarm was canceled at 21:31, and by that time all nine British planes were far away.

There were 21 casualties among Zeffiro's crew, 10 killed and 11 missing, and 20 wounded.

Notes

Bibliography

External links
 Zeffiro (1927) Marina Militare website

Turbine-class destroyers
World War II destroyers of Italy
1927 ships
Ships built by Gio. Ansaldo & C.
Ships built in Genoa
Maritime incidents in July 1940
World War II shipwrecks in the Mediterranean Sea
Destroyers sunk by aircraft
Ships sunk by British aircraft
Naval magazine explosions